Graziella Santini (born 23 July 1960) is a Sammarinese athlete. She competed in the women's long jump at the 1976 Summer Olympics. She was the first woman to represent San Marino at the Olympics.

References

1960 births
Living people
Athletes (track and field) at the 1976 Summer Olympics
Sammarinese female long jumpers
Olympic athletes of San Marino
Place of birth missing (living people)